Zoiglhaus Brewing Company (sometimes simply Zoiglhaus) is a German-style brewery and restaurant in Portland, Oregon's Lents neighborhood.

Description and history

The restaurant, established in 2015, serves German cuisine including knackwurst and sauerkraut. In 2021, the brewery began transitioning into The Zed, an expanded restaurant with a food hall, cocktail bar, and farmers market. The food hall includes Sherpa Kitchen and the cocktail bar, called Zephyr Lounge, serves a variety of drinks including a chai-infused vodka cocktail with almond milk and Kahlua.

Reception and recognition
Andre Meunier ranked Zoiglhaus number 16 in The Oregonian list of Portland's 20 best breweries for 2020. Zoiglhaus was recognized at the Oregon Beer Awards in 2021. Nathan Williams included Zoiglhaus in Eater Portland's 2022 overview of recommended eateries in the Lents neighborhood.

See also
 List of German restaurants

References

External links

 

2015 establishments in Oregon
Beer brewing companies based in Oregon
German restaurants in Portland, Oregon
Lents, Portland, Oregon
Restaurants established in 2015